Loughor is a town in Swansea, Wales. Historically in Glamorgan, it lies on the estuary of the River Loughor. The town has a community council under the name Llwchwr. The town is bordered by the communities of Bynea in Carmarthenshire, Grovesend, Gowerton, and Gorseinon. Loughor is part of the built-up area of Gorseinon.

Etymology
The town's name has been called "possibly the oldest name in Gower", dating back to the Roman era. It derives from the name of the Roman fort of Leucarum.

History
The town includes the site of the Roman fort of Leucarum, over which the Norman Loughor Castle was built in 1106. Loughor developed around the castle.

The town has had its own lifeboat station since 1969, situated near the road bridge. The current lifeboat is a Ribcraft 5.85m RIB.

Loughor later grew as a port, while in the early 20th century the main industries were large tin and steel works. About 1800, John Vivian (1750–1826) of Truro, Cornwall, became managing partner in the copper works at Penclawdd, when Loughor was owned by the Cheadle Brasswire Company of Staffordshire. The Vivian family eventually ran large copper-mining, copper-smelting and trading businesses in and around Swansea (Vivian & Sons) and throughout the 19th century did much to develop Swansea as a city.

Structure and amenities
Loughor town can be divided into two areas, defined by the present electoral wards of Lower Loughor and Upper Loughor, which have separate histories. Lower Loughor lies nearer the sea on low ground, Upper Loughor on higher ground. Loughor initially developed around the Norman castle in what is now the Lower Loughor ward. Upper Loughor began as a distinct settlement, initially around what is now the Glebe Road area, and became established as a separate town by the mid-19th century. Loughor today is mostly a commuter town for Swansea and Llanelli via the Loughor bridge, and has merged with the neighbouring town of Gorseinon.

The West Wales line crosses the River Loughor over the Loughor Viaduct to the west of the town. Loughor railway station was closed in 1960.

Local schools in the town include Tre Uchaf Primary School and Casllwchwr Primary School. Opposite the Tre Uchaf Primary is one of the sites of Gower College Swansea.

The local rugby union team of the town is Loughor RFC.

Notable people
In birth order:
Evan Roberts (1878–1951), minister, a major figure in the 1904–1905 Welsh Revival in religious worship
James Henry Govier (1910–1974), painter, etcher and engraver of the Swansea School, produced several images of Loughor.
Irma Chilton (1930–1990), children's writer in English and Welsh
Leighton James (born 1953), Welsh international footballer

References

Sources
Swansea Art Gallery Catalogue, 1936
The Gower Journal 
Who's Who in Art 
Dictionary of British Artists 1900–1950, by Grant M. Waters, 1975

External links
History of Loughor
www.geograph.co.uk : photos of Loughor and surrounding area

Towns in Swansea